The President of the Council of the Nation of Algeria is the presiding officer of that body. From the creation of the Council of the Nation in 1997, it is the upper house of the Parliament of Algeria.

List

References
  Official website of the Council of the Nation (in Arabic)

Politics of Algeria
Algeria, Council of the Nation
Lists of Algerian people